The Ultimate Christmas Present is a 2000 Disney Channel Original Movie starring Brenda Song and Hallee Hirsh. It premiered December 1, 2000 on Disney Channel as part of their Christmas season.

Plot
Two teen girls, Samantha Elizabeth "Sam" Kwan (age 13) (Brenda Song) and Allison Rachel "Allie" Thompson (age 13) (Hallee Hirsh) find a weather machine at a shack in the woods. After learning of its controls, they use it to make it snow in Los Angeles.

It turns out that the weather machine belongs to Santa Claus (John B. Lowe) and he informs Mrs. Claus about this. To help Santa Claus, she sends two elves, Crumpet (John Salley) and Sparky (Bill Fagerbakke).

A weather man named Edwin Hadley (Peter Scolari) tries to figure out what's causing the strange weather and track it down to keep himself from getting fired by his boss Mr. Martino (Jason Schombing). Edwin's boss expects Edwin to get down to the bottom of the sudden snow appearances.

When Sparky and Crumpet catch up to Santa Claus, they find a footprint of a type of girl shoes that are only made in California. Santa and the elves set off to interrogate each girl on the naughty list that wears those type of shoes.

Soon, the snowstorm gets so large that it spreads to San Francisco and Allie's dad gets snowed in at the airport and may not make it home in time for Christmas. Allie tries to turn it off, but over night it turns itself back on and it creates a blizzard. They are unable to make it do anything now. Samantha shares sad stories with Allie about how her dad would spend Christmas, while Allie is sad about her dad missing Christmas.

During the blizzard, Edwin manages to trace the weather phenomenon to Allie's house. Due to traffic, he manages to borrow a guy's snowmobile.

When Allie and Sam head to the shed to get the flashlights, they encounter Santa, Crumpet, and Sparky who identify Allie as the next person on their naughty list while her best friend Sam is a positive overachiever and good role model in school. They managed to get proof that he's Santa Claus when he tells the girls all about them and the weather machine.

Edwin arrives at Allie's house and manages to gain entry. Edwin does manage to find the weather machine after Allie's brother found it and berated him for messing with it. Upon being cornered in Allie's room by the girls, Santa, and the elves, he announces his plans to be the best weather man in history and gain more publicity on television attempts. During his escape, he sees the guy he borrowed the snowmobile from and crashes into a chocolate making factory where he falls into a chocolate vat. The group follow his trail into the chocolate factory and follows Edwin's chocolatey trail. Sparky follows him up into the raftings where he falls into a box of cotton candy. The group then reclaims the weather machine.

At Santa's shack, he then works to find the problem in the weather machine. With Sam and Allie's help, they manage to fix the weather machine (Santa forgot to put in the right batteries) and stop the weather. Santa then tells Edwin that there is another type of job that deals with weather.

Crumpet and Sparky pick up Allie's dad just in time for Christmas morning. Meanwhile, Hadley gets a job in the Antarctic teaching scientists about the weather.

Cast
 Hallee Hirsh as Allison Rachel "Allie" Thompson
 Brenda Song as Samantha Elizabeth "Sam" Kwan
 Hallie Todd as Michelle Thompson
 Spencer Breslin as Joey Thompson
 Greg Kean as Steve Thompson
 John B. Lowe as Santa Claus
 John Salley as Crumpet
 Bill Fagerbakke as Sparky
 Peter Scolari as Edwin Hadley
 Jason Schombing as Mr. Martino
 Tiffany Desrosiers as Tina

Accolades
Spencer Breslin was Joey in the movie, and garnered a 2000 Young Artist Award nomination for Best Performance in a TV Movie (Comedy or Drama) Young Actor Age 10 or Under.

See also
 List of Christmas films
 Santa Claus in film

References

External links

 

2000 television films
2000 films
American Christmas films
Disney Channel Original Movie films
American television films
Christmas television films
Santa Claus in television
2000s Christmas films
Films set in Los Angeles
Films shot in Vancouver
Films directed by Greg Beeman
2000s American films
Santa Claus in film